Moel y Cerrig Duon is a subsidiary summit of Esgeiriau Gwynion in Gwynedd in north Wales.

Moel y Cerrig Duon tops the eastern end of a long peat bog plateau along with Llechwedd Du. Its summit has a conical shape, rising suddenly from the bog. The summit itself is grassy, marked by a small cairn and a stake. To the north-east is Foel y Geifr, to the east Cyrniau Nod and to the west is Llechwedd Du, Esgeiriau Gwynion, and Aran Fawddwy.

The Aran range continues south from Moel y Cerrig Duon forming a large area of high moorland to the west of Lake Vyrnwy, crowned by Mynydd Coch. To the north it continues to Foel y Geifr, the eastern outpost of the Aran Fawddwy range.

References

Llanuwchllyn
Llanwddyn
Mountains and hills of Gwynedd
Mountains and hills of Powys
Mountains and hills of Snowdonia
Hewitts of Wales
Nuttalls